Siege of Hull may refer to:

 Siege of Hull (1642)
 Siege of Hull (1643)